Greatest Hits: The Evidence is the first greatest hits compilation album by American recording artist Ice-T. It was released on August 8, 2000, via Atomic Pop LLC. "Money, Power, & Women" was the album's single.

Track listing

References

External links
 

Ice-T albums
2000 greatest hits albums
Gangsta rap compilation albums
Albums produced by DJ Aladdin
Albums produced by Afrika Islam